The third season of the American television comedy series How I Met Your Mother premiered on September 24, 2007 and concluded on May 19, 2008. It consisted of 20 episodes, each running approximately 22 minutes in length. CBS broadcast the third season on Monday nights at 8:00 pm in the United States until December 10, 2007 when the season was interrupted by the writer's strike, when the season continued on March 17, 2008 it was moved back to 8:30pm. The complete third season was released on Region 1 DVD on October 7, 2008. In the United Kingdom it aired via E4 from October 30, 2009 weekdays at 7:30pm.

Cast

Main cast
 Josh Radnor as Ted Mosby
 Jason Segel as Marshall Eriksen
 Cobie Smulders as Robin Scherbatsky
 Neil Patrick Harris as Barney Stinson
 Alyson Hannigan as Lily Aldrin
 Bob Saget (uncredited) as Future Ted Mosby (voice only)

Recurring cast
 Lyndsy Fonseca as Penny, Ted's Daughter
 David Henrie as Luke, Ted's Son
 Charlene Amoia as Wendy the Waitress
 Sarah Chalke as Stella
 Marshall Manesh as Ranjit
 Bryan Callen as Bilson

Guest cast
 Britney Spears as Abby
 Enrique Iglesias as Gael
 Maggie Wheeler as Margaret
 April Bowlby as Meg
 John Cho as Jefferson Coatsworth
 Mandy Moore as Amy
 James Van Der Beek as Simon
 Heidi Klum as herself
 Orson Bean as Bob
 Lindsay Price as Cathy
 Kristen Schaal as Laura Girard
 Abigail Spencer as Blah Blah
 Alan Thicke as himself
 Doug Benson as Cool Customs Guy
 Danica McKellar as Trudy
 Busy Philipps as Rachel
 Bob Odenkirk as Arthur Hobbs
 Brad Rowe as George
 Joe Manganiello as Brad

Episodes

Reception
The third season of How I Met Your Mother was met with mostly positive reviews. Michelle Zoromski of IGN gave the season a positive review and said that "the season was fun and clever, a good, consistent flow from the first two seasons".

References

3
2007 American television seasons
2008 American television seasons